Palpophria is a monotypic genus of crustaceans belonging to the monotypic family Palpophriidae. The only species is Palpophria aestheta.

References

Crustaceans
Monotypic crustacean genera